Carl Volny (born December 25, 1987 in Montreal, Quebec) is a Canadian football running back who is currently a free agent. Volny was drafted 32nd overall in the draft by the Winnipeg Blue Bombers and signed a contract with the team on May 18, 2011. He played college football with the Central Michigan Chippewas.

References

External links
Montreal Alouettes bio 
Winnipeg Blue Bombers bio

1987 births
Canadian football running backs
Central Michigan Chippewas football players
Living people
Montreal Alouettes players
Players of Canadian football from Quebec
Canadian football people from Montreal
Winnipeg Blue Bombers players